James D. Pettit (born 1956) is an American diplomat, who served as United States Ambassador to Moldova in 2015–2018. He was nominated by President Barack Obama and confirmed by the Senate. Pettit was sworn in as U.S. Ambassador to the Republic of Moldova on January 16, 2015. He presented his credentials to President Nicolae Timofti on January 30, 2015.

Biography 
Pettit was born in North Dakota, moving to Hamburg, Iowa with his family when he was 7, and later to Council Bluffs, Iowa, at age 15. His father, Jack Pettit, was a Presbyterian minister. James Pettit graduated from Lewis Central High School in Council Bluffs in 1974. He received a B.A. in International Studies from Iowa State University, and a M.A. in National Strategic Studies from the National War College. Between 2007 and 2010 Pettit was the Deputy Chief of Mission at the U.S. Embassy in Kyiv, and previously Pettit served the Department of State as Consul General at the U.S. Embassy in Moscow, Russia (2003 – 2007), Consul General at Embassy Vienna, Austria (1999 – 2003), Director of Office of Post Liaison/Visa Office (1997 – 1999), Director of Washington Processing Center, Bureau of Population, Refugees and Migration (1995 – 1997), Deputy Consul General at U.S. Embassy Moscow, Russia (1992 – 1994), Desk Officer of Office of Taiwan Coordination (1990 – 1992), Desk Officer of Office of Cuban Affairs (1988 – 1990), Consular Officer at American Institute in Taiwan (AIT), Taipei, Taiwan (1986 – 1988), General Services/Political Officer at Embassy Moscow, former Soviet Union (1983 – 1985) and Consular Officer at Consulate General, Guadalajara, Mexico (1981 – 1983). Prior to that, he worked in the banking industry in Washington, D.C. While in Vienna, he served as Chairman and Secretary of the Executive Board of the American International School of Vienna.

United States Ambassador to Moldova

Nomination and confirmation
Pettit was sworn in as U.S. Ambassador to the Republic of Moldova on January 16, 2015. He presented his credentials to President Nicolae Timofti on January 30, 2015.

Tenure

In 2018 Pettit announced support the United States would provide Moldova in economic development as Moldova embraced government reforms and sought to eliminate corruption. The country has been known as a money laundering haven.

Controversies

Pettit has commented on Moldova–Romania relations, noting that Moldova has its own history as well as independence since 1991. His remarks were taken negatively by those supporting the unification of Romania and Moldova. Pettit, in remarks celebrating the 25th anniversary of Moldovan independence, said Moldova should "remain a sovereign, independent state".

Personal life
In 1981 Pettit married Nancy Bikoff Pettit, former U.S. Ambassador to the Republic of Latvia. The couple have two grown children. In addition to English he speaks Russian, Spanish, German, Mandarin Chinese, and Romanian.

See also

List of ambassadors of the United States

References

External links

Ambassadors of the United States to Moldova
Living people
20th-century American diplomats
21st-century American diplomats
Obama administration personnel
Place of birth missing (living people)
People from North Dakota
Iowa State University alumni
National War College alumni
1956 births
People of the American Institute in Taiwan
United States Foreign Service personnel